Wabbit may refer to:

Wabbit (computing), a computing term related to a type of denial of service attack
New Looney Tunes, an American animated television series, known domestically as Wabbit for its first season
Wabbit (video game), a 1982 video game for the Atari 2600 console
cartoon character Elmer Fudd's way of pronouncing "rabbit"